Kubala (Czech/Slovak feminine: Kubalová) is a West Slavic surname. People with the surname include:

 Anton Kubala (born 1981), Slovak footballer
 Branko Kubala (1949–2018), Spanish footballer
 Filip Kubala (born 1999), Czech footballer
 Jan Kubala (born 2000), Czech footballer
 Jana Kubala (born 1966), Czech-Austrian sports shooter
 László Kubala (1927–2002), footballer and manager
 Ludwik Kubala (1838–1918), Polish historian
 Michal Kubala (born 1980), Slovak footballer
 Milan Kubala (1946–2020), Czech Paralympic athlete
 Otomar Kubala (1906–1946), commander of the Hlinka Guard
 Přemysl Kubala (born 1973), Czech volleyball player
 Ray Kubala (born 1942), American football player

See also
 
 Kulubá Maya archeologic site in Yucatan peninsula of Mexico

Czech-language surnames
Slovak-language surnames